The 2011–12 season is the 21st edition of Europe's premier basketball tournament for women - EuroLeague Women since it was rebranded to its current format.

Group stage

Group B

Round 2
Game 1 was played on 21 February 2012. Game 2 was played on 24 February 2012. Game 3 was played on 29 February 2012.

Final eight

Semifinal round
Final Eight will be held in Istanbul. The semifinal round will be played in a round robin system with two groups of four teams. The two group winners will play the final game.

Group A

Classification 3–4

External links
  FIBA Europe website
  EuroLeague Women official website

References

Fenerbahçe Basketball